The Zawia or Zawiya Refinery is an oil refinery located in Zawiya, Libya, which is about  west of Tripoli. 

The refinery was opened in 1974 and it currently produces an estimated  of oil products per day (bpd). It is a topping and reforming refinery having a distillation capacity of 6,000 tonnes per annum. The refinery is operated by the Zawia Oil Refining Company, a subsidiary of the National Oil Corporation. NOC is expected to re-tender an engineering, procurement and construction contract for upgrading the Zawia refinery.

Refinery Expansion and Rehabilitation 2006
The project is being financed by the Libyan government.

Notes

External links

Oil refineries in Libya
Zawiya, Libya
1974 establishments in Libya